Gregory S. Harris (born June 5, 1955) is an American politician who served as a Democratic member of the Illinois House of Representatives in the 13th district from 2007 to 2023. Harris announced that he would not seek reelection in November 2021.

Early life and career
Harris is an alumnus of the University of Colorado at Boulder. He then worked for social service agencies. He served in senior positions with the National Home Furnishings Association. He then became Chief of Staff to Mary Ann Smith a position in which he served for fourteen years.

Legislative tenure
Larry McKeon, who had held the seat for five terms, announced his intention to retire from the legislature in July 2006. He had, though, already been re-elected in the March primary election to be the Democratic candidate on the November general-election ballot, and it fell to the local Democratic committeemen to select his successor to appear on the ballot. Harris, like McKeon, is both openly gay and HIV-positive. He was elected in November 2006. No Republican filed for the District 13 seat. He also ran unopposed for re-election in 2008.

In 2010, Harris sponsored The Illinois Religious Freedom Protection & Civil Union Act (SB1716), which was signed into law on January 31, 2011, by Governor Pat Quinn. The act established civil unions in Illinois.

In 2013, Harris was the lead sponsor in the IL House of the Religious Freedom and Marriage Fairness Act, signed into law by Governor Quinn, an act which legalized same-sex marriage in Illinois that went into effect in June 2014.

On January 10, 2019, Harris became the House Majority Leader.

On November 29, 2021, Harris announced that he would not seek reelection.

As of July 3, 2022, Representative Harris is a member of the following Illinois House committees:

 Personnel & Pensions Committee (HPPN)
 (Chairman of) Rules Committee (HRUL)

Electoral history

References

External links
Representative Greg Harris (D) 13th District at the Illinois General Assembly
100th, 99th, 98th, 97th, 96th, 95th, 94th
State Representative Greg Harris constituency site
 
Gregory Harris  at Illinois House Democrats

1955 births
21st-century American politicians
Democratic Party members of the Illinois House of Representatives
Gay politicians
Inductees of the Chicago LGBT Hall of Fame
LGBT people from Colorado
LGBT state legislators in Illinois
Living people
People with HIV/AIDS
Politicians from Chicago
University of Colorado alumni